The 1990 Big Sky Conference men's basketball tournament was the fifteenth edition, held March 8–10 at the BSU Pavilion at Boise State University in Boise, Idaho.

Defending champion Idaho defeated  in the championship game,  It was the Vandals' second consecutive Big Sky tournament title, and fourth overall (1981, 1982, 1989, 1990).

Format
Similar to the previous year, the tournament included the top six teams in the league standings. The top two earned byes into the semifinals while the remaining four played in the quarterfinals. The top seed met the lowest remaining seed in the semifinals.

Bracket

NCAA tournament
The Vandals gained the automatic bid to the NCAA tournament, and no other Big Sky members were invited to the tournament or  Seeded thirteenth in the West Regional, Idaho lost to Louisville in Salt Lake City in the first round.

See also
Big Sky Conference women's basketball tournament

References

Big Sky Conference men's basketball tournament
Tournament
Big Sky Conference men's basketball tournament
Big Sky Conference men's basketball tournament
Basketball competitions in Boise, Idaho
College sports tournaments in Idaho